Elections to Larne Borough Council were held on 20 May 1981 on the same day as the other Northern Irish local government elections. The election used three district electoral areas to elect a total of 15 councillors.

Election results

Note: "Votes" are the first preference votes.

Districts summary

|- class="unsortable" align="centre"
!rowspan=2 align="left"|Ward
! % 
!Cllrs
! % 
!Cllrs
! %
!Cllrs
! %
!Cllrs
!rowspan=2|TotalCllrs
|- class="unsortable" align="center"
!colspan=2 bgcolor="" | DUP
!colspan=2 bgcolor="" | UUP
!colspan=2 bgcolor="" | Alliance
!colspan=2 bgcolor="white"| Others
|-
|align="left"|Area A
|bgcolor="D46A4C"|30.8
|bgcolor="D46A4C"|1
|27.7
|1
|14.5
|1
|27.0
|1
|4
|-
|align="left"|Area B
|bgcolor="D46A4C"|44.6
|bgcolor="D46A4C"|2
|16.7
|1
|8.6
|0
|30.1
|1
|4
|-
|align="left"|Area C
|bgcolor="D46A4C"|37.2
|bgcolor="D46A4C"|3
|26.0
|2
|23.4
|2
|13.4
|0
|7
|-
|- class="unsortable" class="sortbottom" style="background:#C9C9C9"
|align="left"| Total
|37.2
|6
|24.2
|4
|17.4
|3
|21.2
|2
|15
|-
|}

Districts results

Area A

1977: 1 x DUP, 1 x UUP, 1 x Alliance, 1 x Independent Nationalist
1981: 2 x UUP, 1 x DUP, 1 x Alliance, 1 x SDLP
1977-1981 Change: Independent Nationalist gain from SDLP

Area B

1977: 1 x DUP, 1 x UUP, 1 x Alliance, 1 x Vanguard
1981: 2 x DUP, 1 x UUP, 1 x United Loyalist
1977-1981 Change: DUP and United Loyalist gain from Alliance and Vanguard

Area C

1977: 2 x Alliance, 2 x Vanguard, 2 x Independent, 1 x DUP
1981: 3 x DUP, 2 x UUP, 2 x Alliance
1977-1981 Change: DUP (two seats) and UUP (two seats) gain from Vanguard (two seats) and Independent (two seats)

References

Larne Borough Council elections
Larne